"Experience" is a song recorded by American singer Diana Ross for her fifteenth studio album Eaten Alive (1985). It was written by Barry, Maurice, Robin and Andy Gibb, Barry also became a record producer with Albhy Galuten and Karl Richardson.

Chart performance
The song was released as the third single from the album on April 4, 1986 in Europe, Australia and New Zealand due to the popularity of the previous single "Chain Reaction" in these territories. The song did not become a major success, in the UK it reached at number 47 and spent only three weeks on the chart. In the Dutch Single Top 100 chart, the single reached at number 45; while in Dutch Top 40, it reached the Tipparade, peaking at number three and stayed there for eight weeks. The song performed better in Ireland, hitting the top 20 of the chart. In the US, the release did not take place due to the failures of past singles and the album as a whole.

Music video
A music video was shot to promote the song, Ross herself was involved in its production, and such directors as Marcelo Epstein and Kenny Ortega were attracted as consultants. The producer was Chris Mathur from Pendulum Productions. The music video was released in May 1986.

Track listing
 7" single
 A "Experience" – 4:54
 B "Oh Teacher" – 3:37

 12" single
 A "Experience" (Special Dance Remix) – 5:45
 B1 "Experience" (Instrumental) – 4:50
 B2 "Experience" (Single Version) – 4:07

 12" single
 A "Experience" (Special Dance Remix) – 5:45
 B1 "Experience" (Instrumental) – 4:50
 B2 "Oh Teacher" – 3:37

Charts

References

External links
 

1985 songs
1986 singles
Diana Ross songs
Capitol Records singles
Songs written by Barry Gibb
Songs written by Robin Gibb
Songs written by Maurice Gibb
Songs written by Andy Gibb
Song recordings produced by Barry Gibb
Song recordings produced by Albhy Galuten